Yuiko (written: 結子, 悠衣子 or ゆい子) is a feminine Japanese given name. Notable people with the name include:

, Japanese women's footballer
, Japanese singer
, Japanese voice actress

Japanese feminine given names